Dar El Monastiri is a palace in the Medina of Tunis.

Localization 

It is located in 9 El Monastiri Street near Sidi Mahrez mausoleum.

History
The palace was built in the 19th century during the reign of Mahmud  Bey, by his son Al-Husayn II who later gave it to M'hamed El Monastiri, a noble and a trader of Chachia (chaouachi).
During the French occupation, it was an arts institute.

In 1930, it became the office of craft training and then a regional center of Tunisian arts in 1940.

In 2007, it became the main office of the tunisian center of translation.

References

External links 

EL Monastiri
Hotels in Tunis